Chadwick sign is a bluish discoloration of the cervix, vagina, and labia resulting from increased blood flow. It can be observed as early as 6 to 8 weeks after conception, and its presence is an early sign of pregnancy.

These colour changes were discovered in approximately 1836 by French doctor Étienne Joseph Jacquemin (1796-1872), and are named after James Read Chadwick, who drew attention to it in a paper read before the American Gynecological Society in 1886 and published in the following year, wherein he credited Jacquemin for their discovery.

See also
 Linea nigra
 Goodell's sign
 Hegar sign
Ladin's sign

References

Obstetrics
Medical signs
Midwifery